Alexander Barras (26 January 1914 – 15 August 1986) was an Australian cricketer. He played six first-class matches for Western Australia between 1938/39 and 1947/48.

See also
 List of Western Australia first-class cricketers

References

External links
 

1914 births
1986 deaths
Australian cricketers
Western Australia cricketers